Sermonde is a former civil parish in the municipality of Vila Nova de Gaia, Portugal. In 2013, the parish merged into the new parish Grijó e Sermonde. The population in 2011 was 1,360, in an area of 1.66 km².

References

Former parishes of Vila Nova de Gaia